Zeugophorinae is a subfamily of beetles within the family Megalopodidae. It is a small worldwide group, containing only two genera:

 Zeugophora Kunze, 1818
 Zeugophorella Sekerka, 2013

References

Megalopodidae
Beetle subfamilies